Badalabad (also Romanized as Badalābād) is a village in Dizaj Rural District of the Central District of Khoy County, West Azerbaijan province, Iran. At the 2006 National Census, its population was 6,725 in 1,503 households. The following census in 2011 counted 8,491 people in 2,203 households. The latest census in 2016 showed a population of 9,256 people in 2,581 households; it was the largest village in its rural district.

The 14th-century author Hamdallah Mustawfi mentioned it in his Nuzhat al-Qulub, as Badhalābād, as one of the "best-known" villages in the Khoy district.

References 

Khoy County

Populated places in West Azerbaijan Province

Populated places in Khoy County